Kanch is a village in the Arevut Municipality of the Aragatsotn Province of Armenia. The town is mostly populated by Yezidis.

References

Report of the results of the 2001 Armenian Census

Populated places in Aragatsotn Province
Yazidi populated places in Armenia